"Refugees" is the fourth episode of the fourth season of the HBO original series The Wire. Written by Dennis Lehane from a story by Ed Burns & Dennis Lehane, and directed by Jim McKay, it originally aired on October 1, 2006.

Plot
Mayor Royce meets with Parker, who thinks that campaign posters with Pan-African flag colors can help him shore up Baltimore's black vote, though Royce mocks the idea as tacky. Royce organizes a poker game to raise money for his campaign; among his opponents is Krawczyk. After some discussion with his staff, Carcetti meets with the interdenominational ministerial alliance.  Knowing his chances, Carcetti does not outright ask for support, but promises his ear to them anyway, should he be elected. Watkins watches Marla in a debate with her opponent, Eunetta Perkins, and is outraged when he sees that Royce has broken his promise and put Perkins on his ticket instead of Marla.

Greggs joins Freamon in Homicide, and learns that Landsman shares her disdain for new Major Crimes Units (MCU) head Marimow. She sees Bunk interview a witness who identifies Lex as the killer of Fruit. Elsewhere, Colonel Raymond Foerster meets with Burrell and Rawls to discuss the murder of the state's witness. Royce has asked Burrell to slow the investigation so that no proof that the motive was the victim's upcoming testimony will emerge before the election. Burrell orders Foerster to assign the case to Greggs because of her rookie status. Foerster reluctantly complies. The detectives discuss Marimow's destruction of the MCU, whereupon Bunk calls Marimow the "unit killer" due to his effect on the MCU. Bunk and Freamon serve a warrant on Lex's home, where they find that his grieving mother has set up a shrine to her son. While drinking with Bunk, Freamon theorizes that Marlo has not been linked to any murders because he is hiding corpses in an unknown location.

After losing money in a poker game, Marlo has Partlow pick him up from a grocery store. Inside, he brazenly steals a lollipop in front of the security guard. When the guard confronts Marlo, he replies that the guard's presence meant nothing to him. At Vinson's rim shop, Old Face Andre informs Marlo about Omar's robbery of his store. When Andre tries to get out of a debt, Marlo demands that he hand over his diamond ring as collateral and tells him to pay what he owes. Marlo sends Partlow and Snoop to track and kill the guard. They also visit Bodie, who reluctantly agrees to sell for Marlo. Stanfield soldier O-Dog gives Bodie a package of drugs and the terms of his business relationship with Marlo. After tracking down Michael to his house, Partlow and Snoop hide the guard's body in a boarded up rowhouse.

Proposition Joe tries to convince Marlo to join the New Day Co-Op and aid their planned war with the New York drug dealers intruding into East Baltimore. Marlo, unconcerned because his territory is on the West Side, declines Joe's offers of protection and ends the meeting. At Butchie's bar, Joe meets with Omar and assures him that he had nothing to do with Stringer Bell's scheme turning Omar against Brother Mouzone. To make amends, Joe offers information on Marlo's card game, asking for a quarter of the take. Omar finds the opportunity to his liking and robs the game while Marlo is playing, taking Andre's ring and the money. When Marlo tells Omar that this is not the end of their dealings, Omar warns him that he can find his people with less effort than Marlo will need to find him. Marlo, handing over the ring, replies only, "Wear it in health."

Marimow watches Sydnor and Massey as they turn off the wiretap. Dozerman and Herc report to the MCU, and are lectured by Marimow about how they will be operating. Meanwhile, Bubbles berates Sherrod for missing school and warns him that not attending classes could mean the end of their business partnership. The two meet with Donnelly to discuss Sherrod's poor attendance. Later, Bubbles watches the illiterate Sherrod pretend to read books from school. Sherrod takes out an algebra book and a French dictionary, claiming one to be a workbook that goes with the other. Bubbles isn't fooled but says nothing about the ruse.

Dukie, Randy, Namond and Michael spend time at Cutty's gym and discuss the box cutter incident. When Spider fails to show up for a training session, Cutty again offers to train Michael. The Deacon offers Cutty a janitor position at the boys' middle school. Sherrod joins Prez's class. When Prez tries to get his students to open up about the box cutter incident, Namond and other students instead impertinently interrupt and ask about his career as a police officer. Randy and Sherrod both use the disruption to leave the class; Randy is caught selling candy in the sixth grade cafeteria. When Randy is brought before Donnelly, she demands that he tell her who is responsible for a spate of graffiti at the school. Instead of a custodial position, Cutty finds himself being interviewed to work as an unofficial truant officer. He learns that the school rounds up truants to meet minimum attendance figures it needs to secure extra funding, rather than to ensure they are educated.

Colvin and Parenti meet with the school superintendent, Mrs. Conway, who agrees to fund their in-school program after being assured that the scheme will not bring bad publicity to the school board. At the school, Colvin and Parenti sign confidentiality agreements and safety waivers. Colvin meets with the eighth grade teacher Grace Sampson, who says that many teachers view the scheme as an unwelcome intrusion from City Hall. Colvin observes the students, seeing variation in how well classes perform with the best behavior in the younger grades. While the boys head home, they learn that someone "snitched" and got a student suspended over the graffiti. Prez learns that Chiquan will be scarred from the box cutter attack. Michael starts Bug on his homework and heads to Cutty's gym.
There, Michael agrees to attend a boxing match with Cutty and Justin. Afterwards, Michael avoids Cutty's attempts at conversation and refuses a lift to his house.

Production
Richard De Angelis makes his final appearance as CID Colonel Raymond Foerster.

The dialogue between Marlo and the security guard (specifically the "You want it to be one way" section) was sampled in Little Brother's 2007 album Getback on the song "Sirens".

Title reference
The episode title refers to the detectives fleeing the major crimes unit. It also refers to Bodie being on his own in the streets after the fall of the Barksdale organization.

Epigraph

Prez says this to his wife, referring to the game of football he is watching. This quote is almost certainly a reference to the 1975 film Night Moves, in which the protagonist says virtually exactly the same thing to his wife when she asks him who is winning a televised football game: "Nobody, one side is just losing slower than the other."

Credits

Starring cast
Although credited, Lance Reddick, Deirdre Lovejoy, and Seth Gilliam do not appear in this episode. This is the first episode of the series not to feature Reddick. Since Reddick was the only actor in every episode prior to this, from this point on, nobody has appeared in every episode.

Guest stars

Richard De Angelis as Colonel Raymond Foerster
Jermaine Crawford as Duquan "Dukie" Weems
Maestro Harrell as Randy Wagstaff
Julito McCullum as Namond Brice
Tristan Wilds as Michael Lee
Gbenga Akkinagbe as Chris Partlow
Robert F. Chew as Proposition Joe
Tootsie Duvall as Assistant Principal Marcia Donnelly
Dravon James as Mrs. Grace Sampson
Melvin Williams as The Deacon
Maria Broom as Marla Daniels
Brandy Burre as Theresa D'Agostino
Karen Vicks as Gerry
Alfonso Christian Lover as Old Face Andre
S. Robert Morgan as Butchie
Felicia Pearson as Snoop
Phillip Burgess as Security Guard
Justin Burley as Justin
Rashad Orange as Sherrod
Boris McGiver as Lieutenant Charles Marimow
Rick Otto as Detective Kenneth Dozerman
Delaney Williams as Sergeant Jay Landsman
Shamika Cotton as Raylene Lee
David Fonteno as Poker winner
Sheila Gaskins as Mrs. Anderson
Richard Hildebird as Claudell Withers
Dan DeLuca as Dr. David Parenti
Della Ford as Unknown
Cleo Reginald Pizana as Chief of Staff Coleman Parker
Lora Reed as Unknown
Tyreeka Freamon as School Receptionist
Alan V. Poulson as Developer
Frederick Strother as State Delegate Odell Watkins
Gregory L. Williams as Detective Crutchfield
Michael Willis as Andy Krawczyk

Uncredited appearances

Kwame Patterson as Monk Metcalf
Joilet F. Harris as Officer Caroline Massey
Darrell M. Smith as School Officer Turner
Atif Lanier as Western District Officer
Jonnie Louis Brown as Officer Eddie Walker
Nicole Pettis as Miss Reese - sixth grade English teacher
Sheila Cutchlow as Miss Sheperdson - education bureaucrat
Destiny Jackson-Evans as Crystal Judkins
Jeffrey Lorenzo as Karim Williams
Davone Cooper as Darnell Tyson
Jason Wharton as Albert Stokes
Rakiya Orange as Charlene Young
James Lewis as Marvin - Truant Officer
Steve Staiger as Property Developer
Dave Cooperman as High Roller
Joanna Becker as High Roller
Paul Fahrenkopf as High Roller
Brian Ross Huse as High Roller
Darrell Britt-Gibson as O-Dog
Tyrell Baker as Little Kevin
Keenon Brice as Bug
Seth Hurwitz as Poker player
Mark Joy as Ed Bowers - Property Developer
Tony Bailey as Charles
Unknown as Eunetta Perkins
Unknown as Marcus - young fighter
Unknown as Cashier
Stephanie Burden as Mrs. Pryzbylewski
Unknown as Kwanese
Unknown as Superintendent Conway

References

External links
"Refugees" at HBO.com

The Wire (season 4) episodes
2006 American television episodes